The Allegheny National Recreation Area is a national recreation area of the United States, located on the Allegheny Plateau in northwestern Pennsylvania. It is administered by the United States Forest Service as part of the Allegheny National Forest.

Geography
It was established under the Pennsylvania Wilderness Act of 1984, by Congressman Bill Clinger, Senator Arlen Specter, and Senator John Heinz.

The national recreation area is divided into two units, one around Allegheny Reservoir upstream from Kinzua Dam, and another to the south of Warren on the west bank of the Allegheny River.

Allegheny National Recreation Area was established by the 1984 Pennsylvania Wilderness Act, Public Law 98-585.

References

National Recreation Areas of the United States
Parks in Pennsylvania
Allegheny National Forest
Allegheny Plateau
Parks in McKean County, Pennsylvania
Parks in Warren County, Pennsylvania
Protected areas established in 1984
1984 establishments in Pennsylvania
Protected areas of Warren County, Pennsylvania
Protected areas of Elk County, Pennsylvania
Protected areas of McKean County, Pennsylvania
Protected areas of Forest County, Pennsylvania